Illya Chymchyuri (born 19 April 1973) is a Ukrainian judoka.

Achievements

References

1973 births
Living people
Ukrainian male judoka